The 1936 Tschammerpokal was the 2nd season of the annual German football cup competition. A total of 5,291 teams competed in the qualifying tournament which was divided into four stages. The final stage ended with the final which was held on 3 January 1937 in the Olympiastadion in Berlin. VfB Leipzig defeated last year's runner up, Schalke 04, 2–1.

Matches

First round

Replay

Second round

Replays

Round of 16

Replays

Quarter-finals

Replay

Semi-finals

Final

References

External links
 Official site of the DFB 
 Kicker.de 
 Tschammerpokal at Fussballberichte.de 

1936
1936 in German football cups